Paraíso is a municipality in the state of Santa Catarina in Brazil. The population is 3,360 (2020 est.) in an area of 181 km². The elevation is 520 m.

References

Municipalities in Santa Catarina (state)